Aleksandr Yevgenyevich Akimov (born 11 January 1972) is a Russian football manager and a former player.

References

External links
 

1972 births
People from Vladimir, Russia
Living people
Soviet footballers
Russian footballers
FC Baltika Kaliningrad players
Russian football managers
Association football defenders
Sportspeople from Vladimir Oblast
FC Torpedo Vladimir players
FC Volga Ulyanovsk players